Tomanek is a surname. Notable people by that name include:

 Joseph Tomanek (1889-1974), was a Czech-American artist.
 Dick Tomanek (born 1931), is an American former professional baseball player.
 Jan Tománek (born 1978), is a Czech filmmaker.
 Jan Tománek (born 1972), is a Czech rally co-driver.
David Tománek (born 1954), is a Czech-Swiss-American physicist.